João Nuno Silva Cardoso Lucas (25 October 1979 – 26 May 2015) was a Portuguese footballer who played as a defensive midfielder.

He played professionally in his country for Académica and Boavista, amassing Primeira Liga totals of 129 matches and three goals over five seasons. He moved in 2007 to Red Star Belgrade, being forced to retire shortly after at the age of 28 due to heart problems.

Club career
Born in Caldas da Rainha, Leiria District, Lucas began his career at Académica de Coimbra, making his professional debut during the 1999–2000 season (two matches in the second division) and also being loaned twice to amateur clubs, after which he returned to become an important first-team member.

In 2004–05, Lucas signed with Boavista FC, where he consistently performed during three Primeira Liga seasons. On 3 February 2006, he scored his only official goal for the northerners, in a 3–0 league home win against Associação Naval 1º de Maio.

Retirement
In the 2007 summer transfer window, Lucas joined Serbian giants Red Star Belgrade. However, on 17 March 2008, he announced his decision to stop playing football, as the 28-year-old had heart problems and the doctors told him he would risk his life if he continued playing. "This is the most difficult moment of my life but I have to thank everyone at Red Star who stood by me in the past two months", he told in a news conference.

Death
Lucas died on 26 May 2015 at the age of 35 in his home in Porto. He suffered a sudden cardiac death.

References

External links

Srbijafudbal profile 

1979 births
People from Caldas da Rainha
2015 deaths
Portuguese footballers
Association football midfielders
Primeira Liga players
Liga Portugal 2 players
Associação Académica de Coimbra – O.A.F. players
S.C. Pombal players
Anadia F.C. players
Boavista F.C. players
Serbian SuperLiga players
Red Star Belgrade footballers
Portuguese expatriate footballers
Expatriate footballers in Serbia
Portuguese expatriate sportspeople in Serbia
Portugal B international footballers
Sportspeople from Leiria District